Timeout Detection and Recovery or TDR is a feature of the Windows operating system introduced in Windows Vista. It detects response problems from a graphics card, and if a timeout occurs, resets the card to recover a functional desktop environment and if it fails, it results in Blue Screen of Death.

See also
Windows Display Driver Model
DirectX

References

Further reading

Microsoft Windows